La fille du torrent (French for "The daughter of the torrent") is a 1962 French comedy-drama film written and directed by Hans Herwig.

Plot    
Widowed at the age of twenty, Madame Boissière is a real mother hen who broods to excess over her two sons Robert and Claude. She ruined the marriage of one and keeps the other away from any female presence. The latter runs away and marries a girl from the mountain. When his brother dies, the couple agree to come back to live with Madame Boissière, who tries to separate them.

Cast 
 Alida Valli as Livia Boissière
 Robert Etcheverry as Claude Boissière
 Jacques Fontan as Robert
  Erika Spaggiari as  Irène
 Pauline Carton  as la bonne 
 Alain Quercy as Albert Boissière

References

External links

1962 films
French comedy-drama films
1962 comedy-drama films
1960s French-language films
1960s French films